This is a list of senators from the Northern Territory since the territories were first allowed to elect senators in 1975.

List

Members of the Australian Senate for the Northern Territory
Senators, Northern Territory